Zhob District is a district in the north west of Balochistan province of Pakistan. The population of Zhob District is estimated to 310,544 in 2017. Zhob River is used for irrigation in the Zhob District.

Administration
The 1998 census report lists two sub-divisions: Lower Zhob (comprising Zhob tehsil and Sambaza sub-tehsil) and Kakar Khurasan (encompassing the tehsil of Qamar Din Karez and the subtehsil of Ashewat). A government webpage lists these as Ashwat, Qamar Din Karez, Sambaza and Zhob, without indicating if any of them are sub-tehsils.

Demography 
At the time of the 2017 census the district had a population of 310,354, of which 46,164 (14.87%) lived in urban areas. Zhob had a sex ratio of 845 females per 1000 males and a literacy rate of 33.44% - 43.12% for males and 22.01% for females. 118,986 (38.34%) were under 10 years of age. 1,107 people in the district were from religious minorities.

At the time of the 2017 census, 96.03% of the population spoke Pashto and 1.71% Saraiki as their first language.

The majority of the population of Zhob district is Pashtun. The tribes of Zhob district include the Mandokhail, Khosti, Sherani, Kakar, Sulaimankhel, Harifal, Lawoon and Babar. Currently a large number of IDPs and have been settled within the confines of the District as part of the evacuation from Operation Zarb-e-Azb taking place to the north of Zhob.

References

Bibliography

External links

 
www.zamazhob.asia
 Zhob District at www.balochistan.gov.pk
 Zhob District at www.balochistanpolice.gov.pk

 
Districts of Balochistan, Pakistan